The following are the national records in Olympic weightlifting in the Federated States of Micronesia. Records are maintained in each weight class for the snatch lift, clean and jerk lift, and the total for both lifts by the FSM Weightlifting Association.

Current records

Men

Women

Historical records

Men (1998–2018)

Women (1998–2018)

References

External links

Weightlifting
Micronesia
Micronesia
Weightlifting